Walter Eugene Muehlbronner (born Walter Eugen Mühlbronner; 10 February 1922 – 17 November 2005) was a German-American figure skater. He became a U.S. citizen in 1946. He competed in pairs and ice dance with Irene Maguire, whom he married in 1951.  They won national silver medals in both pairs and ice dance in 1949 and 1950.  The two continued skating as professionals, billed as "Walter and Irene" for 7 years, in the Ice Follies.

In later years, he settled in Philadelphia, working first as a figure skating teacher, then as a skating club manager.  He was president of the Professional Skaters Association for a few years in the early 1970s, and retired from skating in 1990.

Results
(pairs with Maguire)

(ice dance with Maguire)

References 

American male ice dancers
American male pair skaters
2005 deaths
1922 births
German emigrants to the United States
Sportspeople from Stuttgart
20th-century American people